The Los Angeles Thieves or LA Thieves is an American professional Call of Duty League (CDL) team based in Los Angeles, California. It is owned by 100 Thieves.

History 
On November 6, 2020, 100 Thieves announced their expansion in Call of Duty League, following the purchase of the slot previously owned by Immortals Gaming Club under the branding of OpTic Gaming Los Angeles.

The team did not obtain a spot in the inaugural 2020 Call of Duty League season.  The re-addition of 100 Thieves to professional Call of Duty was a welcomed homecoming for the organization. This also marked the return of former professional player turned CEO Matthew Haag, to the scene where his career started. The team finished the 2021 Call of Duty League season with a 7th place in the Regular Season, and a 7th/8th finish at the Championship Weekend. After the end of the season the team released Johnathon "John" Perez, Thomas "TJHaLy" Haly, Carlos "Venom" Hernandez, Austin "SlasheR" Liddicoat, and Cuyler "Huke" Garland, with Sam "Octane" Larew and Dylan "Envoy" Hannon joining the team. 2022 was the team's most successful year, winning their first major title at Major IV in New York City, then claiming the 2022 Call of Duty League Championship title.

Current roster

Team Achievements

Previous roster

References

Call of Duty League teams
Esports teams based in Los Angeles
Esports teams established in 2020